William Allan (1840—1901) was a pastoralist and politician in Queensland, Australia. He was a Member of the Queensland Legislative Assembly and a Member of the Queensland Legislative Council.

Business

William Allan owned a pastoral property Braeside located about  NNW of Dalveen and  SW of Warwick. He grazed cattle and sheep. He had an active breeding program to create a flock of black Merino sheep. He obtained twice the price for black wool than for white and this compensated for the slightly lower yield of fleece from the black Merino sheep.

Politics
On 1 November 1881, Francis Kates, the member for Darling Downs, resigned. William Allan was elected to the Queensland Legislative Assembly at the resulting by-election on 29 November 1881. He held the seat until the 1883 election). He did not contest the 1883 election as he was returning to the United Kingdom for a holiday for the benefit of his health.

On 22 August 1887, William Miles, the member for Darling Downs, died. Allan won the resulting by-election on 6 September 1887. He held Darling Downs until 5 May 1888 (the 1888 election).

At the 1888 elections, there had been an electoral redistribution, abolishing the electorate of Darling Downs, so Allan contested the new electorate of Cunningham and was elected on 19 May 1888. He held Cunningham until 21 March 1896 (the 1896 election), which he did not contest citing health and business considerations.

On 11 March 1897 he was appointed for life to the Queensland Legislative Council. He served on the Council until his death on 19 October 1901.

One of Allan's political ambitions was to create a railway line from Ipswich to Warwick (via the Fassifern Valley and Cunningham's Gap) and then beyond to St George, Cunnamulla and Thargomindah and across to the South Australian border to facilitate trade with South Australia, bypassing New South Wales. He envisaged that Warwick would be the major railway hub on the Darling Downs. However, this trainway line was never built and it was Toowoomba that became the railway hub on the Darling Downs.

Later life
William Allan had a long history of suffering from asthma and bronchitis which were aggravated by an attack of influenza in September 1901, causing him to take a month's leave of absence from the Queensland Legislative Council to restore his health. He travelled to Sydney hoping it would improve his health, but on arrival his condition worsened and his wife was summoned by telegram. She arrived to be with him when he died on Saturday 19 October 1901 at the Hotel Metropole in Sydney. His funeral was held on Monday 21 September 1901 at St Stephen's Presbyterian Church in Macquarie Street, Sydney, after which he was buried in the Waverley Cemetery. When the Queensland Legislative Council met on Tuesday 22 October, William Allan's death was announced and, following by a series of heartfelt eulogies by fellow Council members, the Council was immediately adjourned to mark their deep sorrow at his death.

His Braeside Homestead is now listed on the Queensland Heritage Register.

See also
 Members of the Queensland Legislative Assembly, 1878–1883; 1883–1888; 1888–1893; 1893–1896
 Members of the Queensland Legislative Council, 1890–1899; 1900–1909

References

Members of the Queensland Legislative Assembly
Members of the Queensland Legislative Council
1840 births
1901 deaths
19th-century Australian politicians
Scottish emigrants to colonial Australia